Viscount Samuel, of Mount Carmel in Israel and Toxteth in the City of Liverpool, is a title in the Peerage of the United Kingdom. It was created on 8 June 1937 for the Liberal politician and former High Commissioner of the British Mandate of Palestine, Herbert Samuel. His grandsons, the third and fourth Viscounts, were respectively a prominent Israeli chemist and neurobiologist, and an oil executive. As of 2014 the title is held by the 4th Viscount's son, who succeeded as fifth Viscount in that year.

The first Viscount Samuel was the nephew of the banker Samuel Montagu, 1st Baron Swaythling.

Viscounts Samuel (1937)
Herbert Louis Samuel, 1st Viscount Samuel (1870–1963)
Edwin Herbert Samuel, 2nd Viscount Samuel (1898–1978)
David Herbert Samuel, 3rd Viscount Samuel (1922–2014)
Dan Judah Samuel, 4th Viscount Samuel (1925–2014)
Jonathan Herbert Samuel, 5th Viscount Samuel (b. 1965)

The heir presumptive is the present holder's half-brother Hon. Benjamin Angus Samuel (b. 1983).

See also
Baron Swaythling

Notes

References
Kidd, Charles, Williamson, David (editors). Debrett's Peerage and Baronetage (1990 edition). New York: St Martin's Press, 1990, 

http://www.westportnow.com/index.php?/v2_5/obitjump/dan_samuel_89/

Viscountcies in the Peerage of the United Kingdom
Noble titles created in 1937
Noble titles created for UK MPs
British Jewish families